Neolamprologus savoryi is a species of cichlid endemic to Lake Tanganyika.  This species reaches a length of  TL.  It can also be found in the aquarium trade. The specific name of this cichlid honours Bryan Wyman Savory (1904-1988) who was the District Commissioner of Kigoma in the Tanganyika Territory during the Belgian Hydrobiological Mission to Lake Tanganyika of 1946–1947, this expedition collected the type.

References

savoryi
Taxa named by Max Poll
Fish described in 1949
Taxonomy articles created by Polbot